Sir Edmund Bacon, 6th Baronet (c. 1680 or 1686 – 30 April 1755), of Garboldisham, Norfolk, was a British politician who sat in the House of Commons between 1710 and 1741.

Life
Bacon was the eldest son of Sir Robert Bacon, 5th Baronet and his wife Elizabeth Chandler, daughter of Daniel Chandler. He was admitted at Pembroke College, Cambridge on 5 May 1697. Bacon succeeded his father as baronet in 1704.

In 1710, Bacon stood as Member of Parliament (MP) for Thetford, a seat he held until 1713.  He then represented Norfolk from 1713 until 1715, and again from 1728 until 1741.

On 27 November 1712, Bacon married Mary Kemp, daughter of Sir Robert Kemp, 3rd Baronet at Ubbeston in Suffolk. They had four daughters, but no sons and so with his death the baronetcy devolved to a descendant of Sir Butts Bacon, 1st Baronet, of Mildenhall, third son of Sir Nicholas Bacon, 1st Baronet, of Redgrave, thus uniting both creations.

References

1680s births
1755 deaths
Edmund
Baronets in the Baronetage of England
Alumni of Pembroke College, Cambridge
Members of the Parliament of Great Britain for Norfolk
Members of the Parliament of Great Britain for Thetford
British MPs 1710–1713
British MPs 1713–1715
British MPs 1727–1734
British MPs 1734–1741